The Church of St Audoin is an 11th-century church in Bisceglie, Apulia, in Italy. The church is named for the Frankish bishop and saint Audoin.

The church was built in 1074, and dedicated to the Virgin Mary, to John the Apostle, and to Audoin. Reportedly, the church was built by Normans--hence the dedication to Audoin, a bishop from Rouen.

References

Romanesque architecture in Apulia